The public University of Costa Rica comprises 3 radio stations, amongst which two use frequency modulation and one uses amplitude modulation. They are all three unified under the Spanish umbrella term "Radioemisoras UCR", whose director is Sylvia Carbonell.

Stations

Radio Universidad de Costa Rica

This station (the first radio station of the University of Costa Rica) started broadcasting on 29 November 1949, thus shortly after the Costa Rican Civil War of 1948 and the subsequent second republic (See Junta Fundadora de la Segunda República ). At that time, however, it broadcast on amplitude modulation and had a different name, since abbreviated "TIUCR".

Radio U

The frequency of this channel was first used for repeating broadcasts of the older channel "Radio Universidad de Costa Rica"; until it started it own broadcasts on 22 April 1996. At that time, Carlos Morales was the director of "Radioemisoras UCR" and wanted to receive more student participation on its radio stations. In its early years, multiple programs made by university students emerged on Radio U.

Radio 870 UCR

Started broadcasting songs and micro-broadcasts in 2008; and subsequently broadcasting live on 4 May 2009.

Hi-jacking of August 2015

On 25 August 2015, at 3:30PM (local time (CST)) a group of students and workers of the University of Costa Rica entered the three emission cabins of the three respective stations. The take-over lasted 1 hour. The hi-jackers were unsatisfied due to an agreement between the government and the rectors of Costa Rica's five universities to augment a Special Fund for Higher Education (Spanish: FEES) by 7.38%.

Directors

 José Tasies: Starting from 1977, and throughout a large part of the 1980s.
 Carlos Morales: 1996.
 Guisella Boza: 2004-2013.
 Alejandro Vargas Johansson: 2014.
 Sylvia Carbonell: 16 February 2016 – 16 February 2020.

References

External links
 

Radio stations in Costa Rica
Radio stations established in 1949